Helios 2 may refer to:
 Helios (spacecraft), the 1976 German-American Helios 2 space probe
 Helios 2 (satellite), the 2004 European Helios 2 military satellites

See also 
 Helios (disambiguation)